Katherine Grace Abad-Castillo (born May 17, 1982), known professionally as Kaye Abad, is a Filipino-American actress and singer.

Abad started in 1993 and is a member of ABS-CBN's Star Magic. She was launched as a member of Star Circle (now Star Magic Batch 3) in 1996.

Career
Kaye Abad starts since 1993 in the Philippine entertainment industry was being cast in the Youth Oriented show Ang TV. She also starred in numerous teen-oriented films and TV series, notably paired with John Lloyd Cruz. The tandem of Cruz and Abad is best remembered in the television series Tabing Ilog which ran from 1999 to 2003.

In 2006, Abad plays Cynthia in the prequel fantaserye Super Inggo opposite Makisig Morales followed by its sequel in 2007 Super Inggo 1.5: Ang Bagong Bangis.

In 2009, Abad returned to television via Precious Hearts Romances Presents: Bud Brothers Series. She took over the role originally intended for Roxanne Guinoo, who was supposed to play the lead role opposite Guji Lorenzana.

Lorenzana and Abad were given the lead roles in the third installment of the Precious Hearts Romances series. Abad played a supporting role as Jenny Ambrosio in Angelito: Batang Ama and its sequel Angelito: Ang Bagong Yugto on its weekday afternoon program.

In 2013, she played an antagonist role in the family drama series Annaliza as Stella Celerez-Diaz and in 2014, Abad appeared on Two Wives as Yvonne Aguilluz-Guevarra.

In 2019, she played Ella in Nang Ngumiti ang Langit, marking her comeback to showbiz.

Personal life
She is the sister of former child star Sarah Jane Abad. Her family hails from Cavite.

She became the ambassador of Manila International Airport Authority, the government agency for Ninoy Aquino International Airport, since February 13, 2008.

Abad started dating businessman-athlete Paul Jake Castillo in 2014. Abad and Castillo became engaged in May 2016, with the latter proposing on the former's 34th birthday. They married on December 9, 2016 at a ceremony in Castillo's hometown Cebu City.

In July 2017, Abad announced that she is expecting the couple's first child, due in December. Abad gave birth to their first son named Joaquin on December 22, 2017. On September 2, 2021, Abad gave birth to their second son Iñigo.

Filmography

Television

Film

Awards and nominations

Notes

References

External links

1982 births
Living people
20th-century Filipino actresses
21st-century Filipino actresses
ABS-CBN personalities
Actresses from Cavite
American actresses of Filipino descent
American expatriates in the Philippines
Filipino child actresses
Filipino film actresses
Filipino television actresses
Filipino women comedians
Musicians from Easton, Pennsylvania
Star Magic personalities
21st-century American actresses